The Pointe de la Terrasse (2,881 m) is a mountain in the Beaufortain Massif in Savoie, France.

Mountains of the Alps
Mountains of Savoie